Leota Lorraine (1899–1974) was an American film actress. A leading lady and supporting player of the silent era. 

After the introduction of sound she generally played minor, often uncredited, parts. A stint as Mary Boland's stand-in led to her being cast as Boland's sister in Ruggles of Red Gap (1935).

Selected filmography
 The Promise (1917)
 Her American Husband (1918)
 The Kaiser's Shadow (1918)
 Playing the Game (1918)
 The Finger of Justice (1918)
 Desert Law (1918)
 Know Thy Wife (1918)
 The Girl Dodger (1919)
 The Pest (1919)
 Luck in Pawn (1919)
 The Loves of Letty (1919)
 Her Five-Foot Highness (1920)
 The Misfit Wife (1920)
 The Turning Point (1920)
 The Bowery Bishop (1924)
 Infatuation (1925)
 The Woman I Love (1929)
 Sprucin' Up (1935)
 Ruggles of Red Gap (1935)

References

Bibliography 
 Solomon, Aubrey. The Fox Film Corporation, 1915-1935: A History and Filmography. McFarland, 2011.

External links 
 

1899 births
1974 deaths
American film actresses
Actresses from Kansas City, Missouri
20th-century American actresses